The 1969 Norwegian Football Cup was the 64th edition of the Norwegian annual knockout football tournament. The Cup was won by Strømsgodset after they beat Fredrikstad in the cup final. It took a replay to decide the winner. This was Strømsgodset's first Norwegian Cup title.

First round

|-
|colspan="3" style="background-color:#97DEFF"|Replay

|}

Second round

|-
|colspan="3" style="background-color:#97DEFF"|Replay

|}

Third round

|colspan="3" style="background-color:#97DEFF"|2 July 1969

|-
|colspan="3" style="background-color:#97DEFF"|4 July 1969

|-
|colspan="3" style="background-color:#97DEFF"|6 July 1969

 
|-
|colspan="3" style="background-color:#97DEFF"|Replay: 9 July 1969

|}

Fourth round

|colspan="3" style="background-color:#97DEFF"|2 August 1969

|-
|colspan="3" style="background-color:#97DEFF"|3 August 1969

|-
|colspan="3" style="background-color:#97DEFF"|Replay: 23 August 1969

|}

Quarter-finals

|colspan="3" style="background-color:#97DEFF"|7 September 1969

|-
|colspan="3" style="background-color:#97DEFF"|Replay: 24 September 1969

|}

Semi-finals

|colspan="3" style="background-color:#97DEFF"|5 October 1969

|-
|colspan="3" style="background-color:#97DEFF"|Replay: 8 October 1969

|}

Final

First match

Replay match

References
http://www.rsssf.no

Norwegian Football Cup seasons
Norway
Football Cup